George Conrad Westervelt (December 30, 1879 – March 15, 1956) was a U.S. Navy engineer who created the company  "Pacific Aero Products Co."  together with William Boeing. Westervelt left the company in 1916 and Boeing changed the name of the company to the Boeing Airplane Company the following year.

Early life
George Conrad Westervelt was born in Corpus Christi, Texas to GW Westervelt and Ida Florence DeRyee (DuRy) Westervelt. He attended Corpus Christi Grammar School and Texas Military Institute, San Antonio, Texas.

Naval career

Westervelt was a graduate of the United States Naval Academy and Massachusetts Institute of Technology in naval engineering. Until 1916 Westervelt was stationed on the west coast of the United States. In 1916 he was transferred to the east coast and headed the Naval Aircraft Factory in Philadelphia from 1921 to 1927. Westervelt retired from the USN with the rank of Captain.

Aviation career

During his naval career, Westervelt was also involved in naval aviation. Westervelt became friends with Boeing and worked with him on seaplanes, co-designing the Boeing Model 1, and co-founded what would become The Boeing Company. He left Pacific Aero Products after 1916 after being transferred to the east coast by the USN. Westervelt was assigned by the Navy Bureau of Construction and Repair to work with Curtiss Aeroplane and Motor Company on the Curtiss NC float plane and later became vice-president with Curtiss-Wright following his retirement from the USN. From 1930 to 1931 Westervelt went to China to help out with the China National Aviation Corporation.

Personal life

Westervelt was married to Rieta Brabham Langhorne of Lynchburg, Virginia, on December 20, 1927, and had two daughters, Sally Cary and Effie Eda. He retired from Curtiss-Wright and died in Florida in 1956.

Westervelt is buried with military honors at Arlington National Cemetery in Washington, DC.

References

1879 births
1956 deaths
Businesspeople in aviation
Burials at Arlington National Cemetery
Boeing people
Aircraft designers
MIT School of Engineering alumni
People from Corpus Christi, Texas
TMI Episcopal alumni
United States Naval Academy alumni
United States Navy personnel of World War I
Military personnel from Texas